Amrala is a village in Modinagar under the Ghaziabad district in Uttar Pradesh, India. The main business of the village is agriculture.

Villages in Ghaziabad district, India